Spinibarbus maensis is a species of cyprinid of the subfamily Spinibarbinae. It inhabits Vietnam and is considered harmless to humans. It has been classified as "data deficient" on the IUCN Red List.

References

maensis
Cyprinid fish of Asia
Fish of Vietnam
Endemic fauna of Vietnam
Fish described in 2007